Ravenstor railway station is a Heritage railway station at the northernmost limit of the Ecclesbourne Valley Railway, Wirksworth, Derbyshire.

History
Ravenstor station came into existence through the activities of the Ecclesbourne Valley Railway Association (EVRA). Working with WyvernRail to reopen the former Wirksworth-Duffield branch line the decision was made to create a passenger carrying service where previously only mineral traffic (limestone) had ever been transported. The particular interest lay in the fact that the line was on an incline of 1 in 27; steep indeed for any railway line.

Work over a number of years including the building of an entirely new platform culminated in August 2005 with the opening of the line for passenger services. The first service ran on 1 September 2005 and the station was opened in a ceremony by Gwyneth Dunwoody, MP, Commons Transport Committee Chairman, on 2 September 2005.

Operation
The full timetabled service at this station ceased in 2016, Wyvernrail having terminated it in unexplained circumstances. It now operates an oddly incoherent service run by EVRA, a supporters group.

Location
Ravenstor was a former concentration site for local quarries and did not have a passenger service until one was introduced by the Ecclesbourne Valley Railway. It lies at the bottom of a disused incline which was built to link it to the Cromford and High Peak Railway, now the site of the National Stone Centre and the Steeple Grange Light Railway.

However it is hoped that one day once funds will be made available for a possible extension up the incline towards Middleton Top, depending how steep it would be.  It would also serve the nearby National Stone Centre above.

Route

References

External links
Ecclesbourne Valley Railway Association station information
Ecclesbourne Valley Railway Official Website

Heritage railway stations in Derbyshire
Tourist attractions in Derbyshire
Railway stations built for UK heritage railways
Wirksworth